The 1995 Asian Cycling Championships took place at Amoranto Velodrome, Quezon City, Metro Manila, Philippines from April 23 to May 3, 1995.

Medal summary

Road

Men

Women

Track

Men

Women

References
 Manila Times, April 23 – May 3, 1995

External links
 www.asiancycling.com

Asia
Asia
Cycling
Asian Cycling Championships
International cycle races hosted by the Philippines